The Wachbataillon (full name: Wachbataillon beim Bundesministerium der Verteidigung (WachBtl BMVg) (Guard Battalion at the Federal Ministry of Defence) is the German Bundeswehr's honour guard. The Wachbataillon number about 1,000 soldiers stationed in Berlin. It consists of seven active companies (see list below) and belongs to the Streitkräftebasis (Joint Service Support Command) of the Bundeswehr. The soldiers of the Wachbataillon often refer to themselves as Protter or Protokollsoldaten, meaning protocol soldiers.

Mission

The primary mission of the Wachbataillon is to perform the military honours for the German president, the German Chancellor, the Federal Minister of Defence and the Inspector General of the Bundeswehr during state visits or on comparable occasions.

The Wachbataillon executes the Großer Zapfenstreich ("Grand Tattoo") on special occasions (for example on the 50th anniversary of the Bundeswehr in front of the Reichstag in Berlin on the night of 26 October, 2005) or takes part in events like the ceremonial oath of the Bundeswehr ceremony, parades, state funerals, military tattoos and shows with its drill team which is the best trained special unit of the battalion.

A secondary mission is to perform (ceremonial) guard duty at the Ministry of Defence and other high-profile public places and to protect and guard members of the German government and the Ministry of Defence.

Another secondary mission is to secure and defend the alternate seat of the federal German government in conjunction with the Federal Police forces. Therefore, all soldiers of the Wachbataillon are trained as infantrymen and do regular exercises on military training areas (Truppenübungsplatz) in addition to their protocol duties.

Recruitment

Wachbataillon personnel (especially protocol soldiers) still are not allowed to grow beards or moustaches as well as wearing glasses or being overweight. These are internally known as the "three forbidden B's".

Since 2009, the 1./WachBtl BMVg staff- and supply company has admitted female personnel. Until the end of conscription in Germany in July 2011, about 80 percent of Wachbataillon's personnel were conscripts. In March 2012 the first female officer took command of a platoon of the Wachbataillon.

The soldiers of the Wachbataillon are from all three German armed services (i.e. army, navy and air force) and have the uniforms from all forces at their disposal to be able to perform any drill mission on every occasion. Green berets are used for army uniform, the (dark) blue beret for air force and the navy wears traditionally the sailor suit. The beret badge for army and air force uniform shows the letter "W" as an abbreviation for Wachbataillon.

Equipment
For reasons of tradition the Wachbataillon is the only unit of the Bundeswehr still using the Karabiner 98k bolt action rifle because the traditional Prussian rifle drills can be executed better with that historical weapon. In 1995 remaining swastikas and other Nazi-era markings were removed from these rifles, after criticism regarding the presence of such symbols on Wachbataillon kit by the SPD parliamentary party. As of 29 October 2011 women are allowed to participate in the drill training with the Karabiner 98k.

During normal duty the Wachbattalion uses the Heckler & Koch G36 assault rifle and other kit like the other units of the Bundeswehr. Since 2006 the 1./WachBtl BMVg is the last unit in the Bundeswehr using ten Feldhaubitze 105 mm guns in the role of salute guns.

Tradition
The Wachbataillon has been granted exemption of the Traditionserlass and is thus continuing the traditions of the 1st Foot Guards and the Infantry Regiment 9 Potsdam, the only unit in the Bundeswehr to officially have such ties. Veterans of these regiments are joined with active and former members of the Wachbataillon in the Semper Talis Union.

Structure

The Wachbataillon is stationed at the Julius Leber barracks in the centre of Berlin. Since 2001 the Wachbataillon is part of the Streitkräftebasis. The battalion is organized into seven active companies (four of them honour guard companies) and two inactive military reserve companies.

List of Wachbataillon's companies

See also
Beijing Garrison Honor Guard Battalion, China
Kremlin Regiment, Russia
Republican Guard, France
Representative Honor Guard Regiment of the Armed Forces, Poland
Friedrich Engels Guard Regiment, East Germany
SS-Verfügungstruppe, Nazi Germany

References

External links 

 Official information site about the Wachbataillon (German)
 Semper Talis Union (German)
 Protokollsoldat aus Leidenschaft - Zugführerin im Wachbataillon der Bundeswehr

Battalions of the Bundeswehr
Guards regiments of Germany
Military units and formations established in 1957
Guards of honour
Joint Support Service (Germany)